34 Cancri is a star in the zodiac constellation of Cancer, located about 568 light years away from the Sun. It is a challenge to view with the naked even under good viewing conditions, having an apparent visual magnitude of 6.48.  At the distance of this star, its visual magnitude is diminished by an extinction of 0.14 due to interstellar dust.

This is an A-type main-sequence star with a stellar classification of A1 V. It is a chemically peculiar star, possibly of the magnetic-type (CP2), showing an abnormal abundance of strontium. The star is an estimated 336 million years old with only a moderate projected rotational velocity of 18 km/s. It has an estimated 2.7 times the mass of the Sun and about 2.7 times the Sun's radius. The star is radiating 70 times the Sun's luminosity from its photosphere at an effective temperature of 9,661 K.

References

A-type main-sequence stars
Cancer (constellation)
Durchmusterung objects
Cancri, 34
072359
041904
3372